Vait Abdul-Khamidovich Talgayev (first name also spelled Voit; ; born 11 May 1953) is a Kazakhstani football coach and former player. He is an assistant coach with FC Taraz.

Achievements

As a player
 Soviet First League winner with FC Kairat: 1976

As a manager
 Kazakhstan Premier League champion with FC Taraz: 1996.
 Russian Cup winner with FC Terek Grozny: 2003/04.
 Russian First Division winner with FC Terek Grozny: 2004.

References

1953 births
Living people
Soviet footballers
FC Taraz players
FC Kairat players
Kazakhstani football managers
FC Taraz managers
FC Irtysh Pavlodar managers
FC Kaisar Kyzylorda managers
FC Ordabasy managers
Kazakhstan national football team managers
FC Atyrau managers
FC Akhmat Grozny managers
Kazakhstani expatriate football managers
Expatriate football managers in Russia
FC Zhetysu managers
Russian Premier League managers
Association football defenders
People from Taraz